The two-man bobsleigh competition at the 2010 Winter Olympics in Vancouver, British Columbia, Canada was held at the Whistler Sliding Centre in Whistler, British Columbia on 20–21 February. The German team of André Lange and Kevin Kuske were the defending Olympic champions in this event. Switzerland's team of Ivo Rüegg and Cedric Grand were the defending world champions in this event. The test event held at the Olympic venue was won by the German duo of Thomas Florschütz and Marc Kühne. The last World Cup event prior to the 2010 Games took place in Igls, Austria (southeast of Innsbruck) on 23 January 2010 and was won by the Swiss duo of Beat Hefti and Thomas Lamparter while Rüegg won the overall World Cup in the two-man event.

Records
While the IOC does not consider bobsled times eligible for Olympic records, the FIBT does maintain records for both the start and a complete run at each track it competes.

The start and track records were set at the test event for the 2010 Games on 6 February 2009.

Qualifying teams
On 20 January 2010, the FIBT announced that the following teams had qualified for the 2010 Games: This was finalized on 26 January 2010.

Three teams

Two teams

One team

Practice
Bobsleigh practice began on 17 February 2010 with the two-man event. Eight crashes among 57 runs took place that day. Three crashes occurred during the 18 February 2010 two-man training session. Among the crashes in the two-man event were Switzerland's Beat Hefti and Daniel Schmid who both withdrew from the two man event. Meanwhile, Latvia's Janis Minins withdrew to appendicitis and the emergency surgery that followed on 12 February. Minins returned to competition for the four-man event eleven days later  though he withdrew from the four-man event on 25 February to crashing twice during practice where one of his crews suffering a concussion and another suffering bruised lungs and elbows.

Results
The first two runs took place on 20 February at 17:00 PST and 18:30 PST. On 21 February, the final two runs were scheduled to take place at 13:30 PST and 14:45 PST, but started at 16:00 PST for run three and 17:35 PST for run four to unseasonable warm weather. Temperatures reached  on the afternoon of the 20th and were expected to reach  on the afternoon of the 21st.

First run start order was released on the afternoon of 19 February 2010.

Australia 2 crashed out in run 1 while Great Britain 1 was disqualified when the brakeman Money was ejected from his sled during the first run. Austria 1 was disqualified for violating the total weight rule. Liechtenstein 1 crashed out during the first run and finished, but did not start the second run of the event.

For run 3, Bisset replace Brown in Canada 1 while Harvey replaced Ryan in Australia 1. Italy 1 was disqualified in run 3 for reasons not given. Only the top 20 teams competed in the fourth run. No crashes occurred in the final two runs of the event. Lange tied the track record in the third run that was sent by Florschütz in the second run. The German duo of Lange and Kuske won his record fourth gold medal in bobsleigh at the Winter Olympics and became the second repeat winners of the two-man event after Switzerland's Gustav Weder and Donat Acklin won the event in both 1992 and 1994.

TR - Track Record. Top finish in each run is in boldface.

References

External links
 2010 Winter Olympics results: Two-Man (heat 1), from https://web.archive.org/web/20091025194336/http://www.vancouver2010.com/; retrieved 2010-02-20.
 2010 Winter Olympics results: Two-Man (heat 2), from https://web.archive.org/web/20091025194336/http://www.vancouver2010.com/; retrieved 2010-02-20.
 2010 Winter Olympics results: Two-Man (heat 3), from https://web.archive.org/web/20091025194336/http://www.vancouver2010.com/; retrieved 2010-02-20.
 2010 Winter Olympics results: Two-Man (heat 4), from https://web.archive.org/web/20091025194336/http://www.vancouver2010.com/; retrieved 2010-02-20.

Bobsleigh at the 2010 Winter Olympics
Men's bobsleigh at the 2010 Winter Olympics
Men's events at the 2010 Winter Olympics